Ekenäs, composed of the Swedish words ek- (oak) and näs (promontory or peninsula), is a place name in Fennoscandia. In particular it refers to:

 Ekenäs, Finland, a town in the municipality of Raseborg, formerly an independent city
 Ekenäs Castle in Linköping Municipality, Sweden
 Ekenäs, Kalmar, a village in Kalmar Municipality, Sweden

See also 
 Ekenäs Idrottsförening, a sports club from Ekenäs, Raseborg in Finland